Kerrmoor is an unincorporated community in Clearfield County, in the U.S. state of Pennsylvania.

History
The name "Kerrmoor" is an amalgamation of Kerr and Moore, the surnames of first settlers.

References

Unincorporated communities in Pennsylvania
Unincorporated communities in Clearfield County, Pennsylvania